Xie Yufen  is a Chinese artistic gymnast.

2014 
At the Pacific Rim Championships, she won the silver medal on balance beam.

2015 
In 2015, Yufen won the WOGA Classic.

Competitive history

References

External links 
Xie Yufen at Fédération Internationale de Gymnastique

1998 births
Chinese female artistic gymnasts
Living people
Medalists at the World Artistic Gymnastics Championships
Gymnasts from Hunan